Nurlu may refer to:

People
 Ceren Nurlu (born 1992), Turkish football player

Places
 Nurlu, Somme, France
 Nurlu, Gercüş, Turkey